Bùi Thị Phượng (born 15 June 1986) is a Vietnamese footballer who played as a forward. She has been a member of the Vietnam women's national team.

International career
Bùi Thị Phượng capped for Vietnam at senior level during two AFC Women's Asian Cup qualifications (2008 and 2010).

International goals
Scores and results list Vietnam's goal tally first

References

Living people
Vietnamese women's footballers
Women's association football forwards
Vietnam women's international footballers
Footballers at the 2010 Asian Games
1986 births
21st-century Vietnamese women